Ingrao is a surname. Notable people with the surname include:

Charles Ingrao (born 1948), historian and public intellectual
Chiara Ingrao (born 1949), Italian politician
Marco Ingrao (born 1982), Belgian-Italian footballer
Pietro Ingrao (1915–2015), Italian politician and journalist